Patrick Entat (born ) is a French rugby league footballer who represented France at the 1995 World Cup.

Playing career
From the Sporting Olympique Avignon club in France, Entat made his début for the France in 1986. He went on to play in 34 test matches and captain the side.

He spent several seasons in the English competition, playing for Hull F.C. in 1990/91 and Leeds in 1994/95. In 1996 he was part of the inaugural Paris Saint-Germain squad that competed in the Super League.

His last game for France was at the 1995 World Cup.

Later years
Entat later served as manager for Sporting Olympique Avignon, and in 2001/02 coached Carpentras XIII.

References

Living people
1964 births
France national rugby league team captains
France national rugby league team players
French rugby league coaches
French rugby league players
Hull F.C. players
Leeds Rhinos players
Paris Saint-Germain Rugby League players
RC Carpentras XIII coaches
Rugby league halfbacks
Sporting Olympique Avignon players